Lodewijk Frans Verreycken (in French language sources referred to as Louis-François Verreycken) (1588–1654) was audiencier of the Privy Council of the Habsburg Netherlands and first secretary of the Council of State of the Habsburg Netherlands. He succeeded his father, Lodewijk Verreycken, in 1620 and served under five successive governor-generals of the Habsburg Netherlands.

In 1643 he became the 1st Baron of Bonlez.

His granddaughter Anne-Louise Verreycken married Philippe-Louis de Hénin, 7th Count of Bossu and they became the parents of Cardinal Thomas d'Alsace

He died on 6 May 1654 and was succeeded in office by his son, Charles.

References

People of the Holy Roman Empire
1588 births
1654 deaths